Beasts of No Nation is an album by the Nigerian musician Fela Kuti. It was released in 1989. Kuti is credited with his band Egypt 80. 

Kuti played the title track on his 1986 North American tour and promoted it in interviews. The album sold around 15,000 copies in the United States in its first year of release.

The 2005 novel by Uzodinma Iweala takes its title from the album.

Production
Beasts of No Nation was produced by Wally Badarou. Kuti began thinking about the album while in jail for infractions related to foreign currency and wrote the songs after being released. The title track accuses the Nigerian government and military of transgressions against the Nigerian populace; among other grievances, the album also condemns apartheid. Kuti's use of the phrase basket mouth acknowledges his music's responsibility to protest.

The album cover depicts P. W. Botha, Ronald Reagan, and Margaret Thatcher as horned bloodsuckers. The first line of the title track was inspired by a speech by Botha.

Critical reception

The Gazette called the album "pan-African message music with a capital A for Anger."

AllMusic wrote: "After a few so-so records in the early '80s, Beasts of No Nation was a strong (at times stunning) return to form for Kuti and signaled that his political beliefs kept him from becoming musically lazy." In its 1997 obituary, The Philadelphia Inquirer deemed the album "blunt" and "threatening." Rolling Stone considered it "classic Afro beat."

Track listing

References

Fela Kuti albums
1989 albums
Shanachie Records albums